Cyclocosmia ricketti, commonly known as the Chinese hourglass spider (which generally refers to its genus), is a species of trapdoor spider of the genus Cyclocosmia, which refers specifically to mygalomorphus animals. Cyclocosmia ricketti is native to China and it was first described (under its scientific name) in 1901 by Mary Agard Pocock. They are characterized by their truncated abdomen and the rigid disk at the bottom with a pattern.

Names  

The species was first identified in 1901 by the South African scientist Mary Agard Pocock and was named Halonoproctus ricketti in honour of Charles Boughey Rickett. It was reclassified as Cyclocosmia ricketti in the year 1903.

In China Cyclocosmia ricketti is known under a number of different names including the "Money Trapdoor Spider", "Money Living-Door Spider", and the "Severed Abdomen Spider". In English it is commonly known as the "Chinese hourglass spider" (alongside other members of its genus).

Description  
Cyclocosmia ricketti has a very distinctive plate or disk on its abdomen which according to some people resembles an ancient coin, a seal, or a grinding disc. Because its plate resembles a coin it is commonly referred to in Chinese media as the "Money Trapdoor Spider". The male Cyclocosmia ricketti are about 20.5 millimeters in length while the females of the species tend to be slightly bigger at around 25.83 to 30.0 millimeters in length. The largest known specimens of Cyclocosmia ricketti can exceed 3 centimeters. The disk located on its abdomen typically has a radius of around 1.6 centimeters. 

According to Mr. Zhao Li, Director and Senior Biological Engineer of the Insect Museum of West China in Chengdu, Sichuan, Cyclocosmia ricketti is a nocturnal animal. The scarcity of this arachnid can be explained by its way of habitation. 

Cyclocosmia ricketti, like many other trapdoor spiders, dig burrows which are closed off by hatches in the ground instead of making webs (as they are not good at spinning silk) to catch their prey. They line their burrows with silk threads and mud. They use their disk to plug the opening of the burrow. When a small insect would step on its disk (sometimes referred to as a "copper coin"), Cyclocosmia ricketti will then purportedly shrink its abdomen to allow its prey to fall further into its burrow to be devoured. The coin-shaped disk makes it difficult for its prey to escape from its grasp. Cyclocosmia ricketti doesn't always use this method to hunt, as when its confronted with a non-threatening insect, Cyclocosmia ricketti will get out of its burrow and then directly grab it to eat it. Cyclocosmia ricketti can also use the coin-shaped disk on its abdomen to protect itself from enemies by blocking the entrance to its burrow with it, and using it as a shield, a phenomenon called phragmosis.

Possible mentions in ancient Chinese sources  

According to the Director and Senior Biological Engineer of the Insect Museum of West China in Chengdu, Sichuan Mr. Zhao Li Cyclocosmia ricketti fits the description of a type of arachnid that was mentioned in the Erya as well as the Bencao Shiyi ("Supplement to the Materia Medica"). 

 

The bite of Cyclocosmia ricketti is of low risk and considered to be non toxic to humans. Despite the low toxicity, their bites are known to be painful.

Distribution  
Cyclocosmia ricketti are found in the Chinese provinces of Fujian, Zhejiang, and Sichuan. They are primarily found living in caves. The farthest north they are known to have been found is Sichuan, where in 2016, according to the South China Morning Post, a farmer was working in his garden in Pujiang County, Sichuan province when he thought he found a valuable ancient seal, but then when he saw it move realised it was actually an arachnid, this is notable as it was previously believed that Cyclocosmia ricketti were not able to survive in places where the temperature could drop below 13 degrees Celsius. Winters in the province of Sichuan are known to get even colder. 

Cyclocosmia ricketti is a very rare species and between the years 2000 and 2016 only six such spiders have been spotted in China.

As pets  

Because of the rarity of Cyclocosmia ricketti they are expensive pets. On the pet market they are often known as "Money Trapdoor spiders" and are bred in the Southeast Asian country of Thailand. 

In 2021 a Cyclocosmia ricketti were selling for $3,860 (or about 25,000 yuan). Which is more than double than in 2016, when they were selling for as much as 12,000 RMB online.

References  
 

 

Halonoproctidae
Spiders of China